The Gotham Independent Film Award for Breakthrough Performer is one of the annual Gotham Independent Film Awards. It was first awarded in 1998, with Sonja Sohn and Saul Williams being the first recipients of the award for their roles as Lauren Bell and Ray Joshua in Slam, respectively. 

The category was called Gotham Independent Film Award for Breakthrough Actor until 2021.

Winners and nominees

1990s

2000s

2010s

2020s

Notes

References

Breakthrough Performer
Awards for young actors
Awards established in 1998